Romanian Championships or Romanian Championship may refer to:

 Liga I (football)
 Romanian Chess Championship
 Romanian Figure Skating Championships
 Romanian Gymnastics National Championships
 Romanian Rally Championship
 National American Football Championship of Romania
 SuperLiga (rugby)